Antoine de Maximy (born May 21, 1959) is a French backpacker, television host and producer. He is best known as the TV host and producer of J'irai dormir chez vous (I'll come sleep in your house), a tourism TV show on France 5.

References

French television presenters
1959 births
Living people